Michael J. Kelly (1877–unknown) was an English footballer who played in the Football League for Blackburn Rovers and Bury.

References

1877 births
Date of death unknown
English footballers
Association football forwards
English Football League players
Clitheroe F.C. players
Ashton North End F.C. players
Bury F.C. players
Reading F.C. players
Blackburn Rovers F.C. players
Rossendale United F.C. players
Darwen F.C. players
Padiham F.C. players